Oswald Guillaume Henri Lints (born 16 April 1894; date of death unknown) was a Belgian equestrian. He won a bronze medal in team eventing at the 1920 Summer Olympics in Antwerp, together with Roger Moeremans d'Emaüs, Jules Bonvalet and Jacques Misonne, and placed 10th in individual eventing.

References

External links

1894 births
Date of death unknown
Belgian male equestrians
Olympic bronze medalists for Belgium
Equestrians at the 1920 Summer Olympics
Equestrians at the 1928 Summer Olympics
Olympic medalists in equestrian
Medalists at the 1920 Summer Olympics
20th-century Belgian people